Tavaher (also Romanized as Ţavāher; also known as Sādāt, Sādāt Nejāt, and Sādāt Tavāher) is a village in Elhayi Rural District, in the Central District of Ahvaz County, Khuzestan Province, Iran. At the 2006 census, its population was 435, in 67 families.

References 

Populated places in Ahvaz County